Cochea is a corregimiento in David District, Chiriquí Province, Panama. Its population as of 1990 was 1,790; its population as of 2000 was 2,004.

References

Corregimientos of Chiriquí Province